Eric Vivian Freestone (9 February 1904–12 October 1957) was an Australian rugby league player who played in the 1920s and 1930s. He was a state and national representative winger

Career
Born in Gundagai, New South Wales Eric 'Bluey' Freestone played four seasons with St. George between 1929 and 1932. He came to St. George from Gundagai, New South Wales after already representing New South Wales and Australia in the first test against the touring 1928 English team in Brisbane. 

Freestone is listed on the Australian Players Register as Kangaroo No. 137. Freestone played in the 1930 Grand Final for St. George.

Death
Freestone died on 12 October 1957, aged 53.

References

St. George Dragons players
New South Wales rugby league team players
Country New South Wales rugby league team players
Australia national rugby league team players
Australian rugby league players
1904 births
1957 deaths
Rugby league wingers